The 2019-20 RPI Engineers Men's ice hockey season was the 101st season of play for the program and the 59th season in the ECAC Hockey conference. The Engineers represented Rensselaer Polytechnic Institute and played their home games at Houston Field House, and were coached by Dave Smith, in his 3rd season.

On March 12, ECAC Hockey announced that the remainder of the tournament was cancelled due to the COVID-19 pandemic.

Departures

Recruiting

Roster
As of September 5, 2019.

Standings

Schedule and Results

|-
!colspan=12 style=";" | Exhibition

|-
!colspan=12 style=";" | Regular Season

|-
!colspan=12 style=";" | 
|- align="center" bgcolor="#e0e0e0"
|colspan=12|Remainder of Tournament Cancelled

Scoring statistics

Goaltending statistics

Rankings

References

RPI Engineers men's ice hockey seasons
RPI Engineers
RPI Engineers
2019 in sports in New York (state)
2020 in sports in New York (state)